T. Wingate Andrews High School is a public magnet high school in High Point, North Carolina and part of the Western region of the Guilford County school district. The school enrolls students in grades 9 through 12, follows the traditional school calendar, and runs on a daily schedule of 4 blocks (classes of 90 minutes each), with lunch periods for students during their 3rd block. Andrews has been designated to receive additional support, resources, and incentives as a federal Title I school.

T. Wingate Andrews High School was opened in 1968 with Samuel E. Burford as its first principal. This school was built specifically to follow the federal mandate to integrate the races in the United States, and Burford's selection was notable as he was African American. Students were drawn from the black high school, former William Penn High School (now Penn-Griffin School for the Arts) and from the white high school, High Point Central High School. It was named after Thomas Wingate Andrews (1882–1937), who served as superintendent of High Point schools.

The current principal is Marcus Gause, formerly the principal of the Early College at NC A&T, a non-traditional public high school in Greensboro, NC. Gause took the position beginning in the 2017–2018 school year.

Rivalries and traditions
The school has long had a sports-based rivalry with High Point Central High School, which has led to several cases of vandalism between the two schools. The annual varsity football game between the two schools is highlight of the year for current students and alumnae.

Facilities
Construction on the original school campus finished in 1968. A three-story annex was completed in 2001, along with an auxiliary gym and a drama room. The cafeteria was also renovated and the HVAC system upgraded around that time. The original main building at the school is still in use while the annex contains additional classrooms and the Aviation Academy and Early College of Health Sciences.

The Andrews football teams play home games at the 10,000-seat A.J. Simeon Stadium, the largest stadium in High Point, which also hosts sporting events for High Point Central High School.

Academics
School departments include Athletics/Physical Education (PE), Cultural Arts, Career and Technical Education (CTE), English, Math, Science, Social Studies, and World Languages. Andrews offers a selection of Advanced Placement courses as well as specialized academic magnet programs, including the Aviation Academy and the Early College of Health Sciences.

The Aviation Academy at Andrews High School is an Early College program which provides free college classes and free college textbooks for students interested in aviation or engineering careers. Students can earn an associate degree from Guilford Technical Community College (GTCC) while still in high school. Credits transfer to other colleges and universities, such as Embry-Riddle Aeronautical University or NC State. The program also provides paid internships at aviation businesses, job shadowing opportunities, and FAA licenses and industry certifications, such as Solid Works and AutoCAD. The five main tracks of the program are engineering, pilot, airframe & powerplant mechanic (A&P), avionics technician, and aviation business.
 
The Andrews Early College of Health Science offers an opportunity for students to prepare for a future career in the field of health sciences to include nursing, biotechnology, respiratory therapy, physical therapy, pharmacy or medicine to name a few. Students participate in internships through their courses to gain practical experience in their field of interest. Students in the program complete a rigorous high school curriculum during their freshman, sophomore, and junior years, which prepares them to take first-year college courses, earning dual credit, as a high school senior and a college student. Guilford County Schools (GCS) pays for tuition and non-consumable text books. Students who complete this program earn an Early College diploma in addition to the GCS high school diploma.
 
From 2012 to 2016, Advancement Via Individual Determination (AVID) was another key program at Andrews. According to the school website, "Our first cohort of students began in the fall of 2012 in the 9th grade. AVID is a yearlong elective course taken during the school day. Students are enrolled in the course after completing an application and interview process. During the AVID elective, students learn organizational and study skills, work on critical thinking and asking probing questions, get academic help from peers and college tutors, and participate in enrichment and motivational activities that make college seem attainable. As students progress in AVID, their self-images improve, and they become academically successful students, leaders, and role models for other students. AVID targets students in the academic middle who have the desire to go to college and the willingness to work hard. These are students who are capable of completing rigorous curriculum, but are falling short of reaching their potential. Typically, they will be the first in their families to attend college, and many are from low-income or minority families. AVID pulls these students out of their unchallenging courses and puts them on the college track: acceleration instead of remediation." The AVID program was discontinued in the 2016–2017 school year due to budgeting constraints.

Athletics
Andrews is currently a 2A school with a large athletic program. In the 2015–2016 school year, Derek Anderson became the current athletic director. Anderson had previously coached football and track at Andrews from 2003 until 2007. Sports include soccer, basketball, football, baseball, track, cross country, softball, cheerleading, and volleyball. Eleven of its alumni football players have gone on to play in the National Football League. Several students each year receive athletic scholarships for college, particularly for football, track & field, and women's basketball.

Arts
Andrews offers fine arts classes in visual arts, music, and drama.

Notable alumni
 Tony Baker, NFL running back
 Fantasia Barrino, R&B singer, songwriter, actress, author, and season three winner of American Idol
 Ted Brown, NFL running back and member of the College Football Hall of Fame
 Lawrence Chandler, Composer, musician, producer and founding member of Bowery Electric
 Johnny Evans, NFL and CFL punter and quarterback
 Marcus Gilchrist, NFL safety
 William Hayes, NFL defensive end
 Greg Jeffries, NFL safety
 Junior Robinson, NFL defensive back
 Emily Spivey, television writer and producer. Former writer for Saturday Night Live
 Tony Washington, NFL wide receiver
 Adrian Wilson, NFL safety and 5x pro bowl selection

References

External links
 T. Wingate Andrews High School - Official GCS Page
 NC School Report Card for T. Wingate Andrews High School

Buildings and structures in High Point, North Carolina
Public high schools in North Carolina
Schools in Guilford County, North Carolina
Magnet schools in North Carolina
1968 establishments in North Carolina
Educational institutions established in 1968